Burlington is an unincorporated community and census-designated place (CDP) in Lawrence County, Ohio, United States. The population was 2,676 at the 2010 census. Burlington is a part of the Huntington-Ashland, WV-KY-OH, Metropolitan Statistical Area (MSA). As of the 2010 census, the MSA had a population of 287,702. The community is situated between the villages of South Point and Chesapeake. Its other neighbor is Huntington, West Virginia, which lies across the Ohio River; it is connected via the West Huntington Bridge. Burlington was once the leading community of Lawrence County, being the first county seat and the location of the county's first post office.

History
Beginning in 1817, Burlington was the first and previous county seat of Lawrence County, and its post office the only one in the county until 1821.

Name
Burlington was named after Burlington, Vermont.

National Register of Historic Places
The Burlington 37 Cemetery, the William C. Johnston House and General Store, and the Old Lawrence County Jail, all located in Burlington, are listed on the National Register of Historic Places, as is the nearby Macedonia Church.

Geography

Burlington is located in southern Lawrence County at  (38.4100106, -82.5281600).

Boundaries
According to Census 2000: Incorporated Places/Census Designated Places, Cartographic Boundary Files - Ohio, the southern boundary of the Burlington CDP ends at the current Ohio River northern shoreline, the northern boundary is U.S. Route 52, the western boundary is the village of South Point, and the eastern boundary is the neighboring Sybene, Ohio.

While the village of South Point claims to be the southernmost point in Ohio, Burlington's southernmost point, just upstream from South Point's southern point, is plainly a short distance farther south.

Neighbors
Located on the southern shoreline of Fayette Township, Burlington borders the following communities:
 Huntington, West Virginia - southeast, across the Ohio River
 Ceredo, West Virginia — southwest, across the Ohio River
 South Point — west
Union Township and the village of Chesapeake lie a short distance upstream (east), and Perry Township lies a short distance downstream (northwest).

Demographics

As of the census of 2000, there were 2,794 people, 1,127 households, and 734 families residing in the CDP. The population density was 1,961.1 people per square mile (759.7/km2). There were 1,242 housing units at an average density of 871.8/sq mi (337.7/km2). The racial makeup of the CDP was 87.33% White, 9.48% African American, 0.25% Native American, 0.11% Asian, 0.47% from other races, and 2.36% from two or more races. Hispanic or Latino of any race were 1.72% of the population. 

There were 1,127 households, out of which 25.9% had children under the age of 18 living with them, 46.8% were married couples living together, 13.6% had a female householder with no husband present, and 34.8% were non-families. 30.7% of all households were made up of individuals, and 15.0% had someone living alone who was 65 years of age or older. The average household size was 2.29 and the average family size was 2.84.

In the CDP the population was spread out, with 20.1% under the age of 18, 8.1% from 18 to 24, 23.4% from 25 to 44, 25.4% from 45 to 64, and 23.0% who were 65 years of age or older. The median age was 44 years. For every 100 females, there were 82.4 males. For every 100 females age 18 and over, there were 77.2 males.

The median income for a household in the CDP was $23,995, and the median income for a family was $29,934. Males had a median income of $28,750 versus $23,285 for females. The per capita income for the CDP was $15,619. About 14.3% of families and 16.6% of the population were below the poverty line, including 20.4% of those under age 18 and 8.7% of those age 65 or over.

Features and points of interest
Burlington is Lawrence County's largest center of consumer retail commerce, with many major retail outlets, such as Walmart, Sam's Club, Lowe's, Tractor Supply, and Goodwill. Its proximity to Interstate 64, as well as its direct connection to the cities of Ironton; Huntington, West Virginia; and Ashland, Kentucky, via U.S. Route 52 has made it one of the largest consumer retail traffic choices in the metropolitan area. Burlington is closely affiliated with its neighbor, the village of South Point. Both communities share the same postal zip code 45680, school district (South Point Local School District), and many other public utilities. Within this community partnership, Burlington maintains its own elementary school, volunteer fire department, and also hosts the county's senior citizens center.

Transportation
U.S. Route 52 passes through the northern side of the community.

Local airports include the Tri-State Airport in the Huntington area and the Lawrence County Airpark in Lawrence County, located at the eastern edge of the community.

See also
 List of cities and towns along the Ohio River

References

External links
 Burlington profile
 Cabell-Huntington Convention and Visitors Bureau West Virginia

Census-designated places in Lawrence County, Ohio
Ohio populated places on the Ohio River
Former county seats in Ohio